Amir Lavi is an Israeli footballer plays for Hapoel Umm al-Fahm. He recently made the jump from the youth ranks at F.C. Ashdod to the first team. A cousin of club owner, Haim Revivo, he has represented Israel at the Jetix Kids Cup where he guided Israel to a first-place finish and received MVP honours.

Playing career
His debut was made, like most Israeli players, in a Toto Cup match against Bnei Yehuda on 13 February 2007.

External links
  Profile and statistics of Amir Lavi on One.co.il
  Video clip of Amir Lavi's first goal ever for the F.C. Ashdod first team

1988 births
Living people
Israeli Jews
Israeli footballers
F.C. Ashdod players
Hakoah Maccabi Amidar Ramat Gan F.C. players
Hapoel Azor F.C. players
Bnei Eilat F.C. players
Hapoel Bnei Ashdod F.C. players
Hapoel Ashkelon F.C. players
Maccabi Herzliya F.C. players
Hapoel Iksal F.C. players
Hapoel Umm al-Fahm F.C. players
Hapoel Ra'anana A.F.C. players]
Israeli Premier League players
Liga Leumit players
Israeli people of Libyan-Jewish descent
Footballers from Ashdod
Association football midfielders